William Bird may refer to:

 Sir William Bird (lawyer) (1560/1–1624), lawyer and Member of Parliament for Oxford University
 William Hamilton Bird (  1790), Irish musician
 William Wilberforce Bird (merchant) (1758–1836), Member of Parliament for Coventry
 William Wilberforce Bird (governor) (1784–1857), his son, Deputy Governor of Bengal and briefly Governor-General of India
 Sir William Bird (solicitor) (1855–1950), British solicitor and banker, briefly a Conservative politician
 William Watson Bird (1870–1954), New Zealand headmaster, school inspector, educational administrator and Maori linguist
 Bill Bird (1888–1963), American journalist
 Will R. Bird (1891–1984), Canadian writer
 William Bird (doctor) (born 1961), British medical doctor
 William Bird (cricketer) (1795–?), English cricketer
 William M. Bird (1889–1967), Canadian politician in the Legislative Assembly of New Brunswick
 William Bird (sculptor) (1624–1691), English sculptor

See also
 William Byrd (disambiguation)